Eve Pärnaste (born 19 February 1951 Tartu) is an Estonian psychologist and politician. She was a member of VII Riigikogu.

References

Living people
1951 births
Estonian psychologists
Estonian National Independence Party politicians
Conservative People's Party of Estonia politicians
Members of the Riigikogu, 1992–1995
Women members of the Riigikogu
University of Tartu alumni
Politicians from Tartu
21st-century Estonian women politicians